The Romanian Legion of Italy was a military body made up of  Romanian soldiers in Italy, formed in June 1918, towards the end of World War I.

History 
 In 1916 the Romanian prisoners present in Italy were divided as it follows: 3,600 in the prison camp of Mantua, 2,000 in Cavarzere, 800 in Ostiglia and 800 in Chiaravalle, zones sufficiently distant from the areas of military operations. These came from Transylvania, Banat and Bucovina.
During the "Congress of Oppressed Nationalities in the Austro-Hungarian Monarchy", held in the Capitol hall in Rome between 27 March and 10 April 1918, some Romanian delegates managed to obtain the possibility of forming autonomous armed units from the Italian ones. On June 6, 1918, the "Romanian Legion of Italy" was formed with headquarters at Avezzano concentration camp.

The Legion fought in the "third battle of the Grappa" on 24 October 1918 and in the Vittorio Veneto offensive. It consisted of 830 soldiers and 13 officers.

It ended its function on August 31, 1919.

Order of battle 
  Company I  (250 soldiers) - framed in the 52nd Italian Alpine Division (VIII Army); battles of  Montello and  Vittorio Veneto;
  Company II  - framed in the VIII Army; battles of Sisemoled, Val Vella and Cimone;
  Company III  - framed in the IV Army; 2nd Battle of Monte Grappa.

See also 
 Avezzano concentration camp
 Czechoslovak Legion
 Polish Legions in World War I
 Romanian Volunteer Corps in Russia

References

Bibliography 

Expatriate units and formations of Romania
Romania in World War I
Royal Italian Army